I Am Dina is a 2002 Norwegian-Swedish-Danish film directed by Ole Bornedal. It is based on the 1989 book Dinas bok (Dina's Book) by Herbjørg Wassmo. It was one of the most high-profile films in Norwegian movie history.

Plot 
In Northern Norway during the 1860s, a little girl named Dina accidentally causes boiling lye to spill over her mother at the laundry, causing her mother's death. Overcome with grief, her father refuses to raise her, leaving her in the care of the household servants. Dina grows up wild and unmanageable, with her only friend being the stable boy, Tomas. She summons her mother's ghost and develops a strange fascination with death as well as a passion for living. Family friend Jacob (Gérard Depardieu) encourages Dina's father to hire a tutor, Lorch, who introduces her to the cello. When Jacob asks for Dina's hand in marriage, Dina refuses. Her outraged father slaps her, prompting Dina to attack him. Knowing that Lorch and Dina have grown close, her father retaliates by sending Lorch away, devastating Dina. Unable to come to terms with Lorch's departure, Dina nearly kills Lorch in a fit of insanity.

When Dina (Maria Bonnevie) is old enough, she marries Jacob and moves to Reinsnes, a port he runs with his mother, Karen, and his stepsons Niels and Anders. Niels dislikes Dina's wild ways, and the fact that she has taken over accounting duties at Reinsnes. As Dina's eccentric tendencies become even stronger, Jacob suffers gangrene poisoning after breaking his leg when he falls off the roof of his mistress' house while trying to fix a leak. As Jacob does not appear to be getting better and worsens, Dina takes him on a sled to the top of a cliff and pushes him off to his death, hoping to end his suffering and send him to a better place. Jacob's death reunites her with Tomas and the two have a passionate affair. Several months later, she gives birth to a baby boy that she names Benjamin, presumably her offspring with Tomas. She then learns of Lorch's death when the latter bequeaths her his cello.

Some years later, as a child, Benjamin accidentally sets fire to the barn. Dina falls in love with a courageous, handsome Russian named Zhukovsky (Christopher Eccleston) who rushes into the burning barn to save her beloved horses. It turns out Zhukovsky had seen Dina several years ago in Bergen and was smitten by her, and has come to Reinsnes to court her. However, he leaves suddenly and Dina forces herself on Tomas.

Niels, drunk, rapes a servant named Stina. When Dina finds out, she issues an ultimatum to Niels: marry Stina or leave for America. Niels will not countenance marrying a servant, but cannot afford to leave for America, since Dina has confiscated his savings, giving a third of his money to Stina. Zhukovsky then returns to Reinsnes to take a prisoner back to Bergen. When a drunken and penniless Niels staggers into the house, Dina announces that he too will soon be leaving, to America. Niels then decides to ask a now well-to-do Stina to marry him, but she refuses. Overcome with despair, Niels hangs himself.

Dina's father then announces to Dina that Zhukovsky is an anarchist involved in a plot against the King, and is to hang. A distraught Dina rushes to Bergen to try and exonerate Zhukovsky. But when she visits him in prison and her visiting time is up, Dina attacks the guards, who then brutalize her, causing her to lose her baby with Zhukovsky. On the way back to Reinsnes, she is saved by Anders, who stops her bleeding. Her appeal is successful, however, and Zhukovsky is released, though no one has seen him since. Several weeks later, Dina nearly drowns while teaching Benjamin how to sail but is miraculously saved by Zhukovsky who is on a nearby steamer. In her near-death state, she dreams that she kills Zhukovsky when he announces that he is leaving her again. Dina then comes to and asks if Zhukovsky is going to leave her again. Zhukovsky says he will always be leaving her, though he says he will always be coming back.

Themes 
The main theme of the movie is death, and Dina's inability to let go of those she loves. Dina almost kills Loche when she finds out he is leaving her, kills her husband Jacob (as a mercy killing) when she thinks he is dying in pain, and kills Zhukovsky in a dream where he tells her he is leaving her.

Cast

Production

Casting 
Though the movie is set in 1860s Norway, all the dialogue is in English, resulting in a variety of accents throughout the movie.

There was some controversy surrounding the casting of the movie, as it was felt by many that Gørild Mauseth was the right choice for the part. In the end the casting of Maria Bonnevie was accepted. The movie took in far less in ticket sales than it had cost to produce.

Filming 
The film is shot on location in Kjerringøy, in the present-day municipality of Bodø, in Nordland, Norway, and features spectacular fjord scenery.

References

External links 
 

2002 drama films
2002 films
Danish drama films
English-language Danish films
Films based on Norwegian novels
Films directed by Ole Bornedal
Films produced by Paulo Branco
Films scored by Marco Beltrami
Films set in Norway
Norwegian drama films
English-language Norwegian films
2000s English-language films